Locke, also known as Locke Historic District,  is an unincorporated community in California's Sacramento–San Joaquin River Delta. The 10 acre town was first developed between 1893 and 1915 approximately one mile north of the town of Walnut Grove in Sacramento County.

The village of Lockeport (shortened to "Locke" in 1920) began where the Sacramento Valley Railway and Union Pacific Railroads merged at the southwest corner of the 490 acre swampland parcel deeded on July 6, 1883, to founder, George W. Locke, and his mercantile business partner, Samuel P. Lavenson. Both men were lured in their youth by the California Gold Rush from their birthplaces in New Hampshire. Initially, the settlement consisted of a few wood boarding houses, a saloon, gambling houses, and houses of ill repute that supported a rail yard, shipping wharf/fruit packing shed, and canneries that employed and housed hundreds of immigrants, mostly from Spain, Portugal, Russia, China, Italy, and several other countries from all around the world. The earliest known newspaper reference to Lockeport, California is found in “San Francisco Call” newspaper, dated September 11, 1885. The original Lockeport two-story wood buildings were built for approximately $800 each by lead carpenter named Cleveland Hill. The lack of foundations beneath Locke's Main Street two-story wood buildings has caused many to lean over the past century and has dramatically warped their sides and floors, which has added to the town's rustic charm, enticing modern photographers, artists and tourists.

After a fire destroyed the Chinatown of nearby Walnut Grove in 1915, many Chinese immigrants from the town resettled in and further developed Locke. Chinese-owned businesses, gambling halls, and opium dens were established, along with a Chinese language school. The town continued to thrive as a uniquely Chinese American agricultural community until after World War II, when younger residents begin leaving the town for better educational and employment opportunities in urban centers.

Today, Locke is still a primarily agricultural community near State Route 160, south of Sacramento. It was listed on the National Register of Historic Places in 1971 and further was designated a National Historic Landmark District in 1990 due to its unique example of a historic Chinese American rural community. The population as of 2021 was estimated to be about 100, with Chinese Americans no longer forming the majority.

Description
Locke had its own ZIP Code of 95649, but it was discontinued shortly after the post office bearing that code closed on August 2, 1963. Since then, Locke uses Walnut Grove's ZIP code of 95690, and the community is inside area code 916.

History

The delta swampland on which Locke was built on was home to Native American Miwok and Maidu tribes for hundreds of years. Tribal burial grounds exist on the Locke parcel.

Legislation such as the Swampland Reclamation Act of 1861 was enacted in California to put perceived empty and wasted lands to use and stabilization. Much of this involved draining the Delta wetlands and building levees to regulate flood control in places like Locke. Mainly poor Chinese immigrants were hired to do this backbreaking reclamation work. Though contracted labor was often paid the equivalent of less than one dollar a day per worker, they built hundreds of miles of levees in waist deep water where malaria still rampaged, reclaiming a total 88,000 acres.

The original beginning of Locke, then called Lockeport, was in 1912, when three Chinese merchants, two from the nearby town of Vorden and one from Walnut Grove, contracted tradesmen to construct three buildings. Chan Tin Sin built the first building.  It was a combination dry goods store and beer saloon.  Yuen Lai Sing built a gambling hall.  Owyang Wing Cheong built the Lockeport Hotel & Restaurant.

Following that early construction the Canton Hotel was built, along with several other buildings, one of which later became a bordello. A total of seven structures eventually formed the hamlet of Lockeport.  Though some merchants hoped to provide a destination for riverboat and train passengers, the idea never worked due to the discrimination against Chinese during those times.  One of the homes built in the first phase of construction provided shelter for Chan Tin Sin's cousin Chan Chor Get and his family from the discriminatory acts and violence in San Francisco Chinatown.

On October 7, 1915, the Chinatown of nearby Walnut Grove was destroyed by an accidental fire. Afterwards, the Main Street section of Locke was established and settled by a group of Chinese immigrants from what is now modern day Zhongshan in southern China's Guangdong province, headed by Lee Bing, a Chinese American businessman. Whereas Taishanese-speaking Chinese settlers remained in Walnut Grove after the fire to rebuild, the Cantonese-speaking Zhongshan Chinese settlers migrated to Locke to create a town of their own. The land was leased from George Locke as California law at the time forbade the selling of farmland to Asian immigrants by the California Alien Land Law of 1913.

Due to its relatively large Chinese population at the time, the Chinese Kuomintang political party once had a local chapter in Locke. As the town grew, so did its reputation as a destination for illicit entertainment, gaining the nickname "California's Monte Carlo". At one point, it had five gambling halls, five brothels, speakeasies and opium dens.

The population of Locke swelled with the growing season and harvest. Most of the reclaimed land in the Sacramento-San Joaquin Delta including Locke was used for cash crops, including asparagus, potato, sweet potatoes, white beans, pears, and apples. There would be as many as 1000 to 1500 Chinese people living in Locke.  Farmhands shared rooms in the boarding houses.  Chinese residents living in the homes behind Main Street also took in Chinese farm laborers. Chinese immigrants in Locke started patterns in California agriculture that are continued today in the Sacramento-San Joaquin region, including contracted labor, tenant farming, sharecropping, and the piece wage system. A community garden existed in the back and there was a special oven to make roast pigs on Sundays.  Chinese communities congregated in solidarity under difficult labor and social conditions fostered by legislation such as the Chinese Exclusion Act, creating community gardens that maintained cultural relevancy in the form of growing Chinese cabbage, snow peas, leafy vegetables, winter melon, and tomatoes. Baptist missionary Dr. Charles Shepherd would bring in his Chungmei home boys for the pear harvest at the end of July. Life in Locke had a great deal of accord. The Chinese mothers took care of each other's children when another mother had to go to work at the cannery across the River Road next to the riverboat docks of the Sacramento River.

Ironically, however, the current population of Locke is predominantly white, and the population of Chinese Americans (i.e., descendants of the town's original settlers) is 10.  During the 1940s and 1950s, many of Locke's Chinese Americans, many of whom received better education, began joining the American mainstream by moving out of rural Locke and into the burgeoning suburbs of the major cities.

The Locke Historic District bounded on the west by the Sacramento River, on the north by Locke Rd., on the east by Alley St., and on the south by Levee St. The district was added to the National Register of Historic Places on May 6, 1971.

A Hong Kong-based developer purchased the town in 1977 from the Locke Heirs and sold it in 2002 to the Sacramento Housing and Redevelopment Agency. In 2004, the agency finally allowed the sale of land to those who had been living on it for many years. There were plans to convert Locke into a housing development and tourist attraction. At the north end of Main Street, the restored Locke Boarding House museum (now owned by California State Parks) operates daily, staffed by volunteers. The Town of Locke celebrated its centennial anniversary in 2015, with a large gathering on May 9.

On July 3, 2016, a fire erupted on the second floor of the Locke Country Store on Main Street, which contained two apartments. The fire resulted in the complete destruction of the second floor of the building and a building behind the store. There were no injuries.

The Locke Historic District was designated a National Historic Landmark on December 14, 1990.

Politics
In the state legislature, Locke is in the 3rd State Senate district, represented by Democrat Bill Dodd, and in the 11th State Assembly district, represented by Democrat Jim Frazier.

Books
Locke is the subject of the following books:
Bitter Melon: Inside America's Last Rural Chinese Town by Jeff Gillenkirk and James Motlow (Nine Mile Press). Winner of the Commonwealth Club's 57th Annual Book Award, Silver Medal 
One Day, One Dollar: Locke, California, and the Chinese Farming Experience in the Sacramento Delta by Peter C. Y Leung.
Water Ghosts (a novel) by Shawna Yang Ryan.

References

External links

 Locke, California - Official site with in-depth history
 Locke and Walnut Grove: Havens for Early Asian Immigrants in California Teaching with Historic Places Lesson Plans from the National Park Service
 Five Views: An Ethnic Historic Site Survey for California
 Nancy Wey papers, 1850-1994
 PBS video Preserving the Past Episode of a Public Broadcasting show about Locke California as it was in 1991.
Pacific Innovative Projects Studio video: Letters to Locke Project for PACS class Meeting in the Melting Pot.

Chinese-American history
Chinese-American culture in California
Chinatowns in the United States
Unincorporated communities in Sacramento County, California
Historic districts on the National Register of Historic Places in California
Unincorporated communities in the Sacramento metropolitan area
Populated places established in 1915
1915 establishments in California
National Historic Landmarks in California
Carpenter Gothic architecture in California
National Register of Historic Places in Sacramento County, California